Vincent Fremont (born 1950) is an American art magazine publishing executive, documentary director and producer, the onetime manager of Andy Warhol's studio The Factory, and a co-founder and former co-head of the Andy Warhol Foundation as was proscribed for in  the famous pop Artist's will.

He was both the director and co- producer of Pie in the Sky: The Brigid Berlin Story a biopic on the Warhol superstar Brigid Berlin.  He was also an associate producer of the 1989 film Slaves of New York adapted from the short story collection Tama Janowitz of the same bame.

In 2016 Fremont was named CEO of ARTnews.  He stepped down from the executive position in 2017 but stayed on as an advisor to the company.

Freemont and his wife Shelly Dunn Fremont are among the on screen interviewees in the 2022 Netflix docuseries, The Andy Warhol Diaries, in part adapted from the famous personal volumes of the pop artist of the same name.

References

1950 births
Andy Warhol
American film producers
Living people